= Isidoro Armijo =

Mexican American author

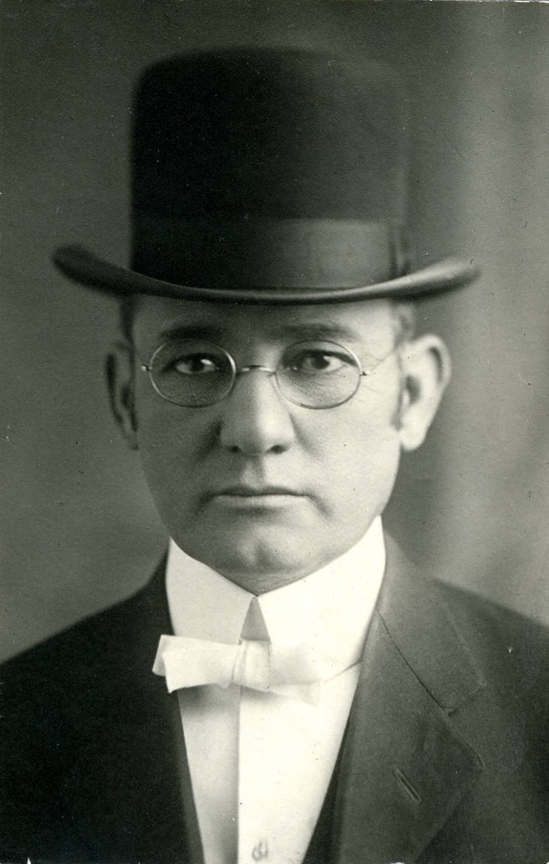
Isidoro Armijo in a bowler hat and suit

Isidoro Armijo (February 15, 1871 - August 22, 1949), also known as "Sunny Jim Sherman", was a Mexican American author, land agent, county clerk, politician, and teacher. Well known for his story "Sesenta minutos en los infiernos", which was also translated into English.

== Family ==
Born in 1871 to well-off Mexican parents, Jacinto Armijo and Juanita Silva de Armijo, Isidoro Armijo was the eldest of six siblings: four brothers (Catarino, Max, Jacinto, Henry) and two sisters (Josephine and Jennie). On January 18, 1901, Isidoro Armijo married Jennie Archibald, an accomplished young woman from the Centennial state of Colorado. They had one daughter, Ernestina Allice (later Mrs. Evermon), born April 9, 1904, and a son, Willard, born in 1908. Isidoro was named for his grandfather, whose name was also Isidro Armijo.

Isidoro Armijo's paternal grandparents (Isidoro Armijo and Catarina Montoya de Armijo) were among the first colonists to settle Doña Ana County. When Jacinto was three his family moved to Las Cruces. Jacinto Armijo was well educated and became a prominent political leader as well as a probate judge.

Jacinto Armijo was born on August 13, 1845 in present-day Socorro, New Mexico and grew up to be an attorney and territorial legislator.

== Opportunities ==
Armijo had a class advantage resulting from his parents being participants of the Mexican elite. That advantage funded and influenced his ability to attend college and having connections to get into politics as well as the judicial system in New Mexico. From an early age you would see Isidoro accompanying his father and Hon. Tranquilino and Col. J. Francisco on their trips across the territory. According to the Santa Fe Newspaper, "Chief Clerk Armijo says (Isidoro Armijo) looking a gentleman and a scholar, actually in a trance, spellbound, absorbing, like a sponge, taking [it] all in."

=== Education ===
Armijo graduated from the College of Agriculture and Mechanical Arts (now the New Mexico State University).

== Career ==
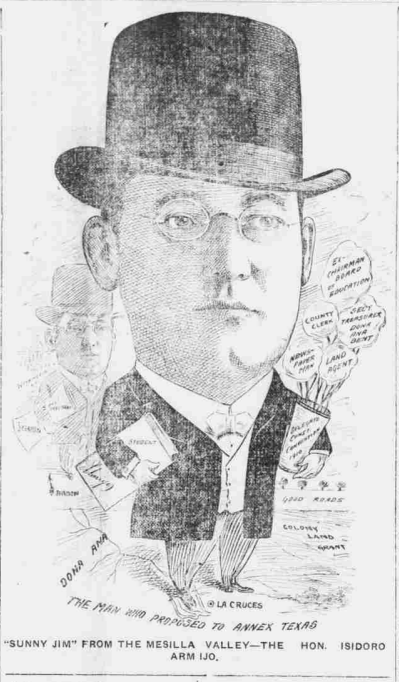
Armijo's many roles

Isidoro Armijo had various occupations, such as becoming a county clerk, chairman for the board of Education, land agent, teacher, and writer. Following college Armijo accepted a position in Puebla, Mexico where he spent three years as a court interpreter. In 1898, Armijo established El Progresso, a newspaper in Trinidad, Colorado.

Soon after working as teacher in New Mexico, he began working as a newspaper writer in Las Cruces. Furthermore, he participated in traveling much of the United States and Mexico, Armjio became an active member of his state's politics. From 1902 to 1911, he was Probate Clerk for Doña Ana County, New Mexico.

Soon after, he was an editor of El Eco del Valle from 1900 to 1904. From 1904 to 1908 he edited La Flor del Valle. In 1910, he was appointed as a member of the New Mexico Constitutional Convention.

On the list of the "Delegates to the Constitutional Convention of 1910", Armijo is listed as the delegate for Doña Ana County and listed as a Republican.

In 1914, he served a term in the House of Representatives for New Mexico. At a later point, he returned to journalism. Armijo had received the largest number of votes cast in his county for any candidate.

He died in Albuquerque, New Mexico on August 22, 1949.

== Writing ==
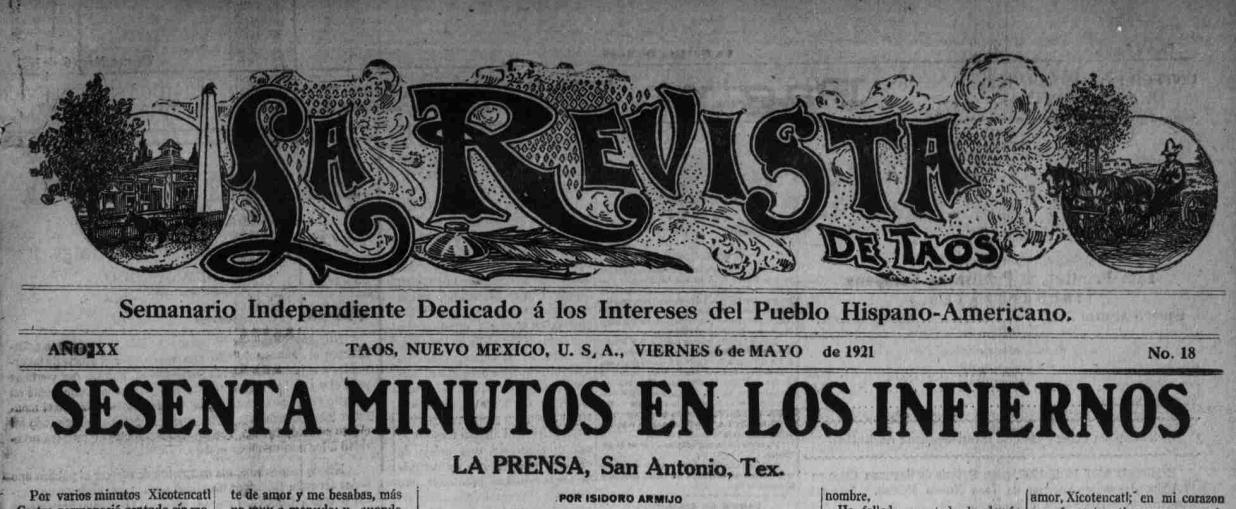
La Revista de Taos, May 6, 1921

Armijo is well known for his story "Sesenta minutos en los infiernos", originally published in the newspaper El Eco del Valle in 1911. This story was later translated and published in 1924 as "Sixty Minutes in Hades" in Laughing Horse magazine. The story is about a woman who leaves her husband for her boyfriend leaving a letter behind depicting her feelings and loss of love for her husband. The woman later rushes home to try to undo what she had done only to find her husband writing a suicide letter with a gun in his hand. The story ends in a positive note with the husband and wife staying together.
